, credited in some games as YU2, is a Japanese video game programmer, designer and producer. He is the former head of the Sega studio Sonic Team, where he was the lead programmer of the original Sonic the Hedgehog series on the Mega Drive in the early 1990s. Naka also led development on games including Nights into Dreams (1996), Burning Rangers (1998), Sonic Adventure (1998) and three games in the Phantasy Star franchise (1987–2000).

In 2006, Naka left Sega to found Prope, an independent game company. He joined Square Enix to direct the platform game Balan Wonderworld (2021), which reunited him with the Sonic co-creator Naoto Ohshima. After the game underperformed critically and commercially, Naka announced he had left Square Enix. In 2022, he said he had been removed from Balan Wonderworld before it was released and sued Square Enix. In late 2022, Naka was arrested twice on suspicions of insider trading at Square Enix.

Life and career

1965—1983: Early life 
Naka was born on September, 1965, in Hirakata, Osaka. He learned to program by replicating and debugging video game code printed in magazines. The experience prompted him to study assemblers and practice writing code during his school classes. After graduating, Naka decided not to enroll in university and stayed in his home town.

1983—1989: Beginnings at Sega 
Around 1983, Naka saw that the video game company Sega was looking for programming assistants and applied. Following a brief interview, he began working for Sega in April 1984. His first task was designing maps and checking floppy disks for Road Runner for the SG-1000, he could not recall if the game was released. His first major project was Girl's Garden (1985), which he and the composer Hiroshi Kawaguchi created as part of their training process. Their boss was impressed and decided to publish the game, and it earned them notice among their peers and Japanese gamers. However Naka felt embarrassed about his code, and did not want to release the game. He developed games going with the flow, and did not do task management at all. The pace of game development was 1 game every 1 or 2 months, and he was essentially living at the company; he recalled bragging with Yu Suzuki on who worked more overtime.

During the Master System era, Naka wanted to develop games that were not possible on Nintendo's Famicom. Examples of this include the 3D Dungeons of Phantasy Star and doing ports of Space Harrier and OutRun, which ran on powerful arcade hardware. The Mega Drive was introduced suddenly, much like the Master System, it was only around the 32X released in 1994 that Sega gave him information about hardware beforehand. Super Thunder Blade was the first game he programmed for the Mega Drive, he requested that sprite-scaling must be implemented in future models of the console, however he was told that it was not possible right now. He also requested a 6Mbit cartridge for Phantasy Star II, which got through. The Mega Drive was Naka's favourite hardware, and he said that he could've kept working on it forever just by making the clock speed faster.

During a visit to the 1988 Amusement Machines Show, Naka was impressed by the ability to move diagonally on slopes in a demonstration of Capcom's game Ghouls 'n Ghosts. Hoping to recreate it, he asked his supervisors at Sega to allow him to port the game to the Mega Drive. Capcom provided him with the source code and ROM data. As he was developing the port, he experimented with aspects such as the speed of the main character to understand how they interacted with the environment. He also altered the slopes and was able to create a functioning 360-degree loop. Sprite-scaling was still a technique that Naka wanted to improve his skill on with a game called Metal Lancer, but it was cancelled halfway through development.

1989 — 1991: Sonic the Hedgehog 

Sega's president Hayao Nakayama decided that Sega needed a flagship series and mascot to compete with Nintendo's Mario franchise. Of Naka's numerous development plans, "a game to beat Super Mario", caught a superiors attention. Naka created a prototype platform game that involved a fast-moving character rolling in a ball through a long winding tube. The idea for a hedgehog that could roll into a ball by jumping and attacking enemies came from his high school notebook, and was unsure to use it. This concept was expanded out with character design by Naoto Oshima and levels conceived by Hirokazu Yasuhara. Naka hoped to showcase the Mega Drive's processing speed through fast and exhilarating gameplay. Part of his approach was based on his experience playing through the original Super Mario Bros (1985); he wondered why he could not complete each level faster the better he got at playing the game. The development took longer than any game Naka worked on before, approximately working only on this game for a year and a half.

Sonic the Hedgehog was released in 1991 and received acclaim; it greatly increased the popularity of the Sega Genesis in North America, and is credited with helping Sega gain 65% of the market share against Nintendo. Naka was dissatisfied with his treatment at Sega and felt he received little credit for his involvement in the success. He quit but was hired by Mark Cerny to work at the American Sega Technical Institute (STI), with a higher salary and more creative freedom.

1991—1994: Sonic sequels and time in United States 
At STI, Naka led development on Sonic the Hedgehog 2, under the condition that it has to have a 2 player multiplayer, much to the dismay of the designer. He went to do long research and how to properly display the splitscreen two-player mode. It was another major success, but its development suffered from the language barrier and cultural differences between the Japanese and American developers. The artist Craig Stitt described Naka as "an arrogant pain in the ass" who was not interested in working with Americans; another artist, Tim Skelly, said that Naka would have been happier working with an all-Japanese team because of the language barrier and cultural differences.

After Sonic the Hedgehog 2 was released in 1992, Naka refused to develop another Sonic game with the American development staff; a Japanese-only development team was formed and led by Naka and worked closely with the American Marketing Manager, Pamela Kelly, and together developed and marketed Sonic the Hedgehog 3 (1994) and Sonic & Knuckles (1994). Originally he wanted to make Sonic 3 a 3D game, with the SVP chip that was also used to port Virtua Racing to the Genesis. However it took too long, and a McDonalds Happy Meal promotion was put in place, and to complete the game in time, it was decided that it to make a 2D game again. Once again, Naka had a very specific hardware request with the lock-on cartridge technology of Sonic & Knuckles, which when combined would form the complete experience, as Sonic 3 was rushed to meet a deadline.

1994—1998: Return to Japan and Sega Saturn 
Following the release of Sonic & Knuckles in 1994, Naka returned to Japan, having been offered a role as a producer. As managing director Hisashi Suzuki brought in videotapes of Virtua Racing and Virtua Fighter, Naka was so impressed that it partly contributed to him going back to Japan. With Naka's return, Sonic Team was officially formed as a brand, and began work on a new intellectual property, Nights into Dreams (1996), for Sega's 32-bit Saturn console. Naka did not have any desire to develop for the 32X, and was disappointed that the Saturn was not true 3D. Observing the development environment he did not want to make a Sonic game right away, and instead created Nights. He persuaded his superiors that Nights would only take one year and that would work on a 3D Sonic in 1997, however the development on Nights took longer than expected. Naka regretted that he was not able to deliver a Sonic game for the Saturn, as this was often cited as a reason for the console's failure.

Meanwhile, in America, STI worked on Sonic X-treme, a 3D Sonic game. Development was hindered by numerous setbacks, culminating in its cancellation in 1996. Reportedly, Naka contributed to the cancellation by refusing to let STI use the Nights game engine and threatening to quit. The X-treme developer Chris Senn dismissed the story as speculation but said that, if true, he understood Naka's interest in maintaining control over the Sonic Team technology and the Sonic franchise. Sonic Team was developing its own 3D Sonic game using the Nights engine, which could have motivated Naka's threat. In July 2022, Naka denied that he had anything to do with X-treme use of the Nights engine and said it would have been useless because Nights was coded in assembly and X-treme was in C. He suggested that the developers invented the story to rationalize their failure to finish X-treme.

1998—2001: Dreamcast 
While Sonic Adventure was in development for the Saturn, Naka was part of the "Dream Team Meetings" which involved talking about plans of what eventually became the Dreamcast as early as 1996. Sonic Team proposed the name "G-Cube". Naka also proposed a multimedia concept that involved taking to a built in microphone to switch TV channels. This method of communication was then used in Seaman.

In 1998, prior to the launch of Dreamcast, Naka and his team visited Sega of America to tour their development offices and observe their work on the game Geist Force, a rail shooter for Dreamcast. According to the producer Mark Subotnick, Naka told his team in Japanese which parts they would take to incorporate in Sonic games and suggested firing all but one of the engineers. Unbeknownst to Naka, several of the Geist Force developers understood Japanese and quit, contributing to the project's cancellation.

Shortly after the Japanese launch of the Dreamcast and Sonic Adventure, Naka was contacted by Sega Chairman Isao Okawa to develop a flagship online game for the Dreamcast. Originally, Naka was unenthusiastic about the idea given his team's inexperience with creating online games. However, the other Sega development studios were preoccupied with their own demanding projects such as Sakura Wars series and Jet Set Radio (2000). This left Sonic Team as the only other alternative that Okawa could rely on. In addition to their inexperience, Naka and his team saw the creation of an online game for Japan, a nation of console gamers, as a serious challenge, akin to creating a new genre. This was further complicated by the perception of online games in the late 1990s having boring visuals and the per-minute fee for dial-up internet in Japan.

To combat these challenges, Naka split his team into three groups, all serving different purposes, before rejoining to develop Phantasy Star Online (2001). The first and second groups were focused on discovering the limits of the Dreamcast's capabilities, specifically in terms of graphical fidelity and the possibilities of online play on the system. The third group would work on various projects under Naka's supervision that would lead them closer to their goal. This would culminate with the release of Sonic Team's Chu Chu Rocket (1999), an action-puzzle game and the first game for the system to support online console gaming. Additionally, it was the only game directed by Naka at Sega as he would move on to become a producer, overseeing  output from Sonic Team. Following Chu Chu Rocket's release, all three teams collaborated on the development of Phantasy Star Online. It is reported that after Okawa became ill in 2000, Naka would send reports to the hospital, updating him on the team's progress.

In 2000, Sega began to restructure its development operations as part of the dissolution of Sega Enterprises, transforming its arcade and console studios into semi-autonomous subsidiary companies. While each studio was given an unprecedented amount of creative freedom, Naka felt it important to preserve the Sonic Team brand name, and therefore the legal name of the company was SONICTEAM, Ltd. Naka was installed as the CEO of the new company.

2001—2006: Final years at Sega 
In March 2001, Sega discontinued the Dreamcast and left the video game hardware market. Sega's semiautonomous entities were reabsorbed, including Sonic Team. Naka remained as an executive officer, overseeing all of Sega's output until his departure in 2006. According to the former Sega producer Takashi Yuda, senior Sega figures including Toshihiro Nagoshi and Yu Suzuki were reporting to Naka. In late 2001 or early 2002, Peter Moore, the president of Sega of America, arranged focus groups with teenagers and found that Sega's reputation was declining. According to Moore, Naka responded angrily and accused Moore of having falsified the findings.

After Sega left the hardware market, Sonic Team began developing for consoles by other manufacturers; Naka became fond of the Nintendo GameCube. He regretted that he did not bring Phantasy Star Online to the PlayStation 2, as Monster Hunter came out in 2004 and became popular.

2006–2016: Prope 

On March 16, 2006, Naka announced that he would leave Sega to create his own game studio, Prope. He said he considered it a benefit to be able to create games other than Sonic the Hedgehog games. Naka also explained that the video game industry was young, leading to quick promotions; he felt his senior position had given him less time to be close to development. The last Sonic game Naka was involved was Sonic the Hedgehog (2006). He regretted leaving Sega during the middle of its development as it was poorly received.

Naka and Prope developed small games for the Wii and mobile devices, such as Wii Play: Motion and Ivy The Kiwi?. This included a reunion with Sega as they published Let's Tap and Let's Catch for the Wii. Naka explained that while it was uncommon in the west, he always maintained a strong relationship with the company despite his departure. 

The games helped finance their first large-scale production, Rodea the Sky Soldier, which finished development in 2011 but was not released until 2015. According to Naka, the publisher, Kadokawa Games, would not release the game until they developed a version for the Nintendo 3DS. Following the launch of the Nintendo Wii U in 2012, Kadakowa opted to create a Wii U version based on the 3DS version, delaying it until 2015. In November 2015, Kadokawa Games released Rodea the Sky Soldier on the 3DS and Wii U, while packaging Naka and Prope's Wii version as bonus bundled with the initial print of the Wii U version. In response, Naka used his social media following to request people prioritize playing the Wii version. Naka was awarded with the Bizkaia Award at the Fun & Serious Game Festival in 2016.

2016–2022: Square Enix and Balan Wonderworld 

In 2018, Naka joined Square Enix to form the subsidiary developer Balan Company, which aimed to facilitate collaboration between internal and external staff. Naka described Balan Company as a collective of designers and artists focusing on genres outside the norms of Square Enix. Prope remained in business, but with Naka its only employee.

Balan Company's first game, Balan Wonderworld, was co-developed by Arzest, a company which had previously co-developed multiple projects for Nintendo and Mistwalker. A key staff member at Arzest was Naoto Ohshima, a former Sega artist who created the designs for Sonic the Hedgehog and Doctor Eggman. When Naka joined Square Enix in January 2018, he considered making social mobile games but was encouraged by Shinji Hashimoto to make action games for the new market, which was seeing a resurgence in classic action and platform games. Naka approached Ohshima and Arzest about a collaboration. It was the first collaboration between Naka and Ohshima since Sonic Adventure in 1998. However, the Square Enix producer Shinji Hashimoto encouraged him to develop games that would capitalize on the resurgence in platform games.

Upon its release in 2021, Balan Wonderworld received generally negative reviews and underperformed commercially. Following the release, Naka announced that he was no longer working at Square Enix and said he was considering retirement. On December 22, 2021, he released a free mobile game, Shot2048, similar to the games 2048 and Chain Cube.

In April 2022, Naka announced that he had sued Square Enix. According to Naka, he was removed as the director six months before release of Balan Wonderworld following disagreements over its stability. Naka said he had attempted to negotiate to address his concerns, but was ignored. He concluded that Square Enix and Arzest did not "value games or game fans". In July, Naka tweeted a photo of the Nights team with Ohshima's face blacked out, and expressed his anger over Balan Wonderworld.

2022: Insider trading charges 
On November 17, 2022, Naka was arrested by the Tokyo District Public Prosecutors Office and charged with violating the Financial Instruments and Exchange Act of 2006. The Public Prosecutors Office accused him of insider trading related to non-public information, with the media speculating that the arrest was related to 2020 mobile game Dragon Quest Tact. Naka allegedly bought 10,000 shares of the developer, Aiming, before the game was announced to the public. Two other former Square Enix employees were also arrested, alleged to have bought 162,000 shares between December 2019 and February 2020 for approximately 47.2 million yen.

On December 7, Naka was arrested again, accused of having purchased 144.7 million yen of shares of the developer ATeam before their game Final Fantasy VII: The First Soldier was announced. He was later indicted on insider trading charges by the Tokyo District Public Prosecutors Office. Naka admitted to the ATeam insider trading in court in March 2023.

Personal life
Naka is an avid racer and car enthusiast, having mentioned his Ferrari 360 Spider in multiple interviews. In November 2004, he competed in round six of the Kumho Tyres Lotus Championship in Tasmania. In April 2022, Naka participated in the first round of the Elise Super Tech competition at the Mobility Resort Motegi circuit, finishing seventh place.

Works

References

External links
 
 Official Prope website 
 Sonic Team Speaks (archived by the WaybackMachine)
 Sega's Yuji Naka Talks!
 Yuji Naka On New Beginnings At His Studio, Prope
 Life after Sega: The Sonic creator talks about being free of the hedgehog

1965 births
Living people
People from Hirakata
Japanese video game designers
Japanese video game programmers
Sega people
Square Enix people
Japanese video game directors
Japanese video game producers
Game Developers Conference Lifetime Achievement Award recipients